Rohini is a sub-city and neighbourhood in the North West Delhi district of the Union Territory of Delhi, India. It was the first sub-city project of Delhi Development Authority (DDA), which was started in the 1980s to provide a composite society for all income groups. Rohini is one of the 12 zones administered under the Municipal Corporation of Delhi.

Geography 
The neighbouring areas are Pitampura, Shalimar Bagh, Haider Pur, Mangol Puri, Sultanpuri, Khera Kalan, Khera Khurd, Budh Vihar, Karala, Kanjhawala, Samaypur, Barwala, Pooth Khurd, Kirari Suleman Nagar, Pooth Kalan, Mukarba Chowk and Bawana.

Politics 
Vijender Gupta is the Member of Legislative Assembly for the Rohini Vidhan Sabha Constituency. The MP of Rohini (North-West Delhi) is Hans Raj Hans. The location has composite demographics with its inhabitants following different faiths and religions and speaking an array of languages including Hindi and Punjabi language

Transport 
Rohini Heliport owned by Pawan Hans, was inaugurated by Union Civil Aviation Minister Ashok Gajapathi Raju on 28 February, 2017. The heliport, spread over 25 acres and situated a few kilometres away from the Rithala metro station, is the first of its kind in the country.

It has three stations on the Red Line of Delhi Metro: Rohini East, Rohini West and Rithala metro station. Rohini also has two station on the Yellow Line, the Rohini sector 18,19 metro station, Samaypur Badli metro station making it one of Delhi Metro's major hubs.

Population and area 
Rohini has a population of approximately 860,000 inhabitants and covers an area of 3,015 hectares. The sub-city is under active development, and is expected to expand to 7,548 hectares and 1.1 million people by the completion of the development project.

Education 
Queen Mary's School Rohini

References

External links 
Elected Members: Rohini Zone (Ward-wise) at Municipal Corporation of Delhi
Rohini Sector 11 Pin Code

Neighbourhoods in Delhi
North West Delhi district
Cities and towns in North West Delhi district
District subdivisions of Delhi